Art medallions are an ancient art form said to have been first introduced by the Romans chiefly to display portrait effigies of noted persons such as kings, queens and the like. Most art medallions were hand cast in bronze or similar metal alloys. These art medallions were not to be worn but rather decorative and slowly found their way into monetary coinage using a struck method of casting.  The art form has continued until the 21st century.

Renaissance era
Pisanello (Antonio Pisano) (c.1395-1455?) is noted as the first artist to have brought the fine art of art medallions to the forefront of the visual arts and is noted as being arguably the greatest portrait medallist of the Renaissance era and presumably is unsurpassed in his work for his attention to great detail, precision and clarity.

Modern era
From the 17th-19th century the art medallion grew in popularity often being cast in other materials other than bronze such as copper, gold, silver and even plaster/chalk. The latter being banded in a metal material and used as souvenirs from the mid to late Victorian era. These often depicted mythological scenes executed with the greatest of care.

By the 20th century interest in the hand cast art medallion started to wane considerably in Western art and more interest was focused on the struck medallion where several copies could be made by a mechanical method. However, by the mid-1930s a slight resurgence took place in the visual arts as to the importance of the hand cast art medallion, in particular in North America, and artists started to acknowledge this form of sculpture as being a legitimate art form and not merely a craft as previously recognized.

By the late 20th century Canadian artists such as Emanuel Hahn, Elizabeth Wyn Wood, Walter Allward, Dora de Pedery Hunt (b. 1913), Elizabeth Bradford Holbrook (b. 1913-2009) worked almost effortlessly keeping the craft alive.

Today the hand cast art medallion is alive and well in Europe but staggering in North America save for a few select artists of note. A Renaissance of the art medallion to what it used to be is questionable but those few artists that are practicing the art are making a definite impact on their culture.

See also

Medallion (disambiguation)
Medal
Shell gorget
Coin

Visual arts media
Crafts